Operation Suncob was a military operation by the Australian Army in Timor in 1945 to investigate what happened to Operation Cobra. It consisted of Captain P. Wynne and Corporal J.B. Lawrence, both AIF and Z Special Unit. They were inserted into Timor on 2 July 1945 despite the Services Reconnaissance Department not hearing back from Operation Sunlag which had been undertaken shortly prior. Both men were captured and tortured by the Japanese.

It had the same aim as Operation Pigeon.

References

Notes

Suncob
1945 in Portuguese Timor
Suncob
South West Pacific theatre of World War II